El Torreón de San Lázaro is round tower of masonry built on the shore of the Caleta de San Lazaro. It has a wooden entry door at ground level. With the passage of time, the San Lazaro cove was filled and the tower was included in a Republican-era park named after Major General Antonio Maceo. In an 1853 map of Havana it is shown as the Torreón de Vijias (lookouts). In 1982, the Torreón was inscribed along with other historic sites in Old Havana on the UNESCO World Heritage List, because of the city's importance in the European conquest of the New World and its unique architecture.

History

From this fortification a lookout could warn military forces by way of torches of threats of attack by corsairs and pirates. In this regard, it served as a link in the defense chain between the Batería de la Reina, La Punta, and the Santa Clara Battery located at the site of today's Hotel Nacional.

Gallery

See also

 Barrio de San Lázaro, Havana

 Caleta de San Lazaro

 Espada Cemetery
 La Casa de Beneficencia y Maternidad de La Habana
 Hospital de San Lázaro, Havana
 Malecón, Havana
 La Cabaña
 Batería de la de la Reina
 Santa Clara Battery

References

Buildings and structures in Havana
History of Havana
Spanish colonization of the Americas
19th century in Havana
Buildings and structures completed in 1781
Coastal fortifications
Spanish colonial fortifications in Cuba
Fortifications of Havana
Artillery batteries
Architecture in Havana